The Consultative Council for Indonesian Citizenship, often known by its Indonesian abbreviation Baperki, was an organization founded in Indonesia in 1954 by Indonesians of Chinese descent. It stood in the 1955 Indonesian legislative election, winning 0.5% of the vote, and was awarded one seat in the People's Representative Council.  The organization sponsored schools including Res Publica University (1960). The group was associated with the Indonesian Communist Party (PKI). After the 1965 coup attempt in Indonesia, Res Publika was burned down and replaced by a new school, Trisakti, and the group was banned.

See also
Chinese Indonesians

References

Communism in Indonesia
Mass organizations of the Communist Party of Indonesia
Defunct organizations based in Indonesia
Indonesian people of Chinese descent
Universities in Indonesia